In mathematics, the Fibonacci polynomials are a polynomial sequence which can be considered as a generalization of the Fibonacci numbers. The polynomials generated in a similar way from the Lucas numbers are called Lucas polynomials.

Definition
These Fibonacci polynomials are defined by a recurrence relation:

The Lucas polynomials use the same recurrence with different starting values:

They can be defined for negative indices by

Examples 
The first few Fibonacci polynomials are:

The first few Lucas polynomials are:

Properties 
 The degree of Fn is n − 1 and the degree of Ln is n.  

 The Fibonacci and Lucas numbers are recovered by evaluating the polynomials at x = 1;  Pell numbers are recovered by evaluating Fn at x = 2.  

 The ordinary generating functions for the sequences are:

The polynomials can be expressed in terms of Lucas sequences as 

where  is the imaginary unit.

Identities

As particular cases of Lucas sequences, Fibonacci polynomials satisfy a number of identities, such as

Closed form expressions, similar to Binet's formula are:

where 

are the solutions (in t) of

For Lucas Polynomials n > 0, we have

A relationship between the Fibonacci polynomials and the standard basis polynomials is given by

For example,

Combinatorial interpretation

If F(n,k) is the coefficient of xk in Fn(x), namely 

then F(n,k) is the number of ways an n−1 by 1 rectangle can be tiled with 2 by 1 dominoes and 1 by 1 squares so that exactly k squares are used. Equivalently, F(n,k) is the number of ways of writing n−1 as an ordered sum involving only 1 and 2, so that 1 is used exactly k times. For example F(6,3)=4 and 5 can be written in 4 ways, 1+1+1+2, 1+1+2+1, 1+2+1+1, 2+1+1+1, as a sum involving only 1 and 2 with 1 used 3 times. By counting the number of times 1 and 2 are both used in such a sum, it is evident that 

This gives a way of reading the coefficients from Pascal's triangle as shown on the right.

References

 

 
Jin, Z. On the Lucas polynomials and some of their new identities. Advances in Differential Equations 2018, 126 (2018). https://doi.org/10.1186/s13662-018-1527-9

Further reading

External links

Polynomials
Fibonacci numbers